Clean is a 2022 documentary about the life of Sandra Pankhurst. The film follows Pankhurst and her team of cleaners who clean crime scenes, places where people have committed suicide, and incidents of hoarding. It was directed by Lachlan Mcleod and released in Australia in June 2022. The film has screened at the Melbourne International Film Festival and Edinburgh International Film Festival.

Plot 
Clean focused on the life of Pankhurst, detailing how she was forcibly given up by her birth mother and subsequent adoption by a family that did not want her. Pankhurst was evicted at seventeen. At this time, Pankhurst was male and later married, had children, and the marriage eventually failed once Pankhurst realised she wished to transition. The majority of the documentary focuses on Pankhurst's later life as the owner and operator of a trauma cleaning service.

Reception 
On Rotten Tomatoes the film has an approval rating of 100% based on 15 reviews. The film was described as being "shot plainly" without fanfare, although one critic did call the addition of re-enactments of events from Pankhurst's past as an "unnecessary major misstep". Variety also described the re-creation scenes as unnecessary, but noted Clean "remains an engaging, spirited documentary, designed less to provoke than to inspire". Clean was the film chosen to close the 70th Melbourne International Film Festival.

References 

2022 films
Australian documentary films
Transgender-related documentary films
2022 LGBT-related films
2022 documentary films
Australian LGBT-related films